Sylvain Estibal (born 13 March 1967) is a French reporter, author and film director.
The film The Last Flight was based on Estibal's 2006 book. He directed the film When Pigs Have Wings for which he was awarded the César Award for Best Debut.

References

External links
 

1967 births
Living people
French male film actors